The mountain mosaic-tailed rat (Paramelomys rubex) is a species of rodent in the family Muridae.
It is found in West Papua, Indonesia and Papua New Guinea.

Notes

References

Paramelomys
Rodents of Papua New Guinea
Mammals of Western New Guinea
Mammals described in 1922
Taxonomy articles created by Polbot
Rodents of New Guinea
Taxa named by Oldfield Thomas